The Volgodonsk constituency (No.155) is a Russian legislative constituency in Rostov Oblast. The constituency covers much of eastern Rostov Oblast.

Members elected

Election results

1993

|-
! colspan=2 style="background-color:#E9E9E9;text-align:left;vertical-align:top;" |Candidate
! style="background-color:#E9E9E9;text-align:left;vertical-align:top;" |Party
! style="background-color:#E9E9E9;text-align:right;" |Votes
! style="background-color:#E9E9E9;text-align:right;" |%
|-
|style="background-color:"|
|align=left|Sergey Ponomaryov
|align=left|Independent
|
|30.77%
|-
|style="background-color:"|
|align=left|Valentin Miroshnikov
|align=left|Independent
| -
|18.01%
|-
| colspan="5" style="background-color:#E9E9E9;"|
|- style="font-weight:bold"
| colspan="3" style="text-align:left;" | Total
| 
| 100%
|-
| colspan="5" style="background-color:#E9E9E9;"|
|- style="font-weight:bold"
| colspan="4" |Source:
|
|}

1995

|-
! colspan=2 style="background-color:#E9E9E9;text-align:left;vertical-align:top;" |Candidate
! style="background-color:#E9E9E9;text-align:left;vertical-align:top;" |Party
! style="background-color:#E9E9E9;text-align:right;" |Votes
! style="background-color:#E9E9E9;text-align:right;" |%
|-
|style="background-color:"|
|align=left|Tatyana Shubina
|align=left|Independent
|
|27.08%
|-
|style="background-color:"|
|align=left|Sergey Ponomaryov (incumbent)
|align=left|Agrarian Party
|
|21.95%
|-
|style="background-color:"|
|align=left|Aleksandr Popov
|align=left|Independent
|
|8.31%
|-
|style="background-color:#2998D5"|
|align=left|Nikolay Kozitsyn
|align=left|Russian All-People's Movement
|
|6.30%
|-
|style="background-color:#FF4400"|
|align=left|Olga Vereshchak
|align=left|Party of Workers' Self-Government
|
|5.68%
|-
|style="background-color:"|
|align=left|Vladimir Samarsky
|align=left|Education — Future of Russia
|
|4.73%
|-
|style="background-color:#3A46CE"|
|align=left|Gennady Motyanin
|align=left|Democratic Choice of Russia – United Democrats
|
|4.40%
|-
|style="background-color:"|
|align=left|Gennady Klimov
|align=left|Independent
|
|4.35%
|-
|style="background-color:"|
|align=left|Sergey Mishanin
|align=left|Independent
|
|4.15%
|-
|style="background-color:#DA2021"|
|align=left|Nikolay Rodzyanko
|align=left|Ivan Rybkin Bloc
|
|1.73%
|-
|style="background-color:#000000"|
|colspan=2 |against all
|
|9.79%
|-
| colspan="5" style="background-color:#E9E9E9;"|
|- style="font-weight:bold"
| colspan="3" style="text-align:left;" | Total
| 
| 100%
|-
| colspan="5" style="background-color:#E9E9E9;"|
|- style="font-weight:bold"
| colspan="4" |Source:
|
|}

1999

|-
! colspan=2 style="background-color:#E9E9E9;text-align:left;vertical-align:top;" |Candidate
! style="background-color:#E9E9E9;text-align:left;vertical-align:top;" |Party
! style="background-color:#E9E9E9;text-align:right;" |Votes
! style="background-color:#E9E9E9;text-align:right;" |%
|-
|style="background-color:"|
|align=left|Viktor Topilin
|align=left|Independent
|
|32.17%
|-
|style="background-color:#020266"|
|align=left|Ivan Litvinov
|align=left|Russian Socialist Party
|
|18.92%
|-
|style="background-color:"|
|align=left|Nikolay Sungurov
|align=left|Communist Party
|
|17.41%
|-
|style="background-color:#1042A5"|
|align=left|Grigory Zabolotsky
|align=left|Union of Right Forces
|
|8.67%
|-
|style="background-color:"|
|align=left|Sergey Grinko
|align=left|Independent
|
|3.14%
|-
|style="background-color:#7C273A"|
|align=left|Nikolay Kozitsyn
|align=left|Movement in Support of the Army
|
|2.99%
|-
|style="background-color:"|
|align=left|Nikolay Lysenko
|align=left|Russian All-People's Union
|
|1.07%
|-
|style="background-color:#000000"|
|colspan=2 |against all
|
|14.09%
|-
| colspan="5" style="background-color:#E9E9E9;"|
|- style="font-weight:bold"
| colspan="3" style="text-align:left;" | Total
| 
| 100%
|-
| colspan="5" style="background-color:#E9E9E9;"|
|- style="font-weight:bold"
| colspan="4" |Source:
|
|}

2003

|-
! colspan=2 style="background-color:#E9E9E9;text-align:left;vertical-align:top;" |Candidate
! style="background-color:#E9E9E9;text-align:left;vertical-align:top;" |Party
! style="background-color:#E9E9E9;text-align:right;" |Votes
! style="background-color:#E9E9E9;text-align:right;" |%
|-
|style="background-color:"|
|align=left|Valery Dyatlenko
|align=left|United Russia
|
|56.55%
|-
|style="background-color:#FFD700"|
|align=left|Viktor Topilin (incumbent)
|align=left|People's Party
|
|12.34%
|-
|style="background-color:"|
|align=left|Vladimir Karpov
|align=left|Liberal Democratic Party
|
|5.59%
|-
|style="background-color:#164C8C"|
|align=left|Anna Gordeyeva
|align=left|United Russian Party Rus'
|
|5.02%
|-
|style="background-color:#00A1FF"|
|align=left|Aleksandr Lebed
|align=left|Party of Russia's Rebirth-Russian Party of Life
|
|3.73%
|-
|style="background-color:"|
|align=left|Georgy Zheluntsyn
|align=left|Independent
|
|1.02%
|-
|style="background-color:#000000"|
|colspan=2 |against all
|
|14.11%
|-
| colspan="5" style="background-color:#E9E9E9;"|
|- style="font-weight:bold"
| colspan="3" style="text-align:left;" | Total
| 
| 100%
|-
| colspan="5" style="background-color:#E9E9E9;"|
|- style="font-weight:bold"
| colspan="4" |Source:
|
|}

2016

|-
! colspan=2 style="background-color:#E9E9E9;text-align:left;vertical-align:top;" |Candidate
! style="background-color:#E9E9E9;text-align:leftt;vertical-align:top;" |Party
! style="background-color:#E9E9E9;text-align:right;" |Votes
! style="background-color:#E9E9E9;text-align:right;" |%
|-
| style="background-color:"|
|align=left|Viktor Deryabkin
|align=left|United Russia
|
|44.69%
|-
| style="background-color: " |
|align=left|Oleg Pakholkov
|align=left|A Just Russia
|
|20.59%
|-
|style="background-color:"|
|align=left|Aleksandr Dedovich
|align=left|Communist Party
|
|13.42%
|-
|style="background-color:"|
|align=left|Sergey Malykhin
|align=left|Liberal Democratic Party
|
|8.91%
|-
|style="background-color:"|
|align=left|Aleksey Lyutov
|align=left|Rodina
|
|2.66%
|-
|style="background-color:"|
|align=left|Roman Yatsenko
|align=left|Communists of Russia
|
|2.54%
|-
|style="background-color:"|
|align=left|Yury Koshelnikov
|align=left|The Greens
|
|2.17%
|-
|style="background-color:"|
|align=left|Vyacheslav Stepanenko
|align=left|Civic Platform
|
|1.22%
|-
| colspan="5" style="background-color:#E9E9E9;"|
|- style="font-weight:bold"
| colspan="3" style="text-align:left;" | Total
| 
| 100%
|-
| colspan="5" style="background-color:#E9E9E9;"|
|- style="font-weight:bold"
| colspan="4" |Source:
|
|}

2021

|-
! colspan=2 style="background-color:#E9E9E9;text-align:left;vertical-align:top;" |Candidate
! style="background-color:#E9E9E9;text-align:left;vertical-align:top;" |Party
! style="background-color:#E9E9E9;text-align:right;" |Votes
! style="background-color:#E9E9E9;text-align:right;" |%
|-
| style="background-color:"|
|align=left|Viktor Deryabkin (incumbent)
|align=left|United Russia
|
|46.26%
|-
|style="background-color:"|
|align=left|Aleksey Misan
|align=left|Communist Party
|
|20.42%
|-
|style="background-color:"|
|align=left|Tatyana Belova
|align=left|New People
|
|9.87%
|-
|style="background-color:"|
|align=left|Dmitry Yevseyev
|align=left|A Just Russia — For Truth
|
|8.49%
|-
|style="background-color:"|
|align=left|Aleksey Plotnikov
|align=left|Liberal Democratic Party
|
|7.53%
|-
|style="background-color: "|
|align=left|Marina Zinchenko
|align=left|Party of Pensioners
|
|5.94%
|-
| colspan="5" style="background-color:#E9E9E9;"|
|- style="font-weight:bold"
| colspan="3" style="text-align:left;" | Total
| 
| 100%
|-
| colspan="5" style="background-color:#E9E9E9;"|
|- style="font-weight:bold"
| colspan="4" |Source:
|
|}

Notes

References

Russian legislative constituencies
Politics of Rostov Oblast